Hermosa is an unincorporated community in Albany County, Wyoming, United States. Hermosa means beautiful woman in Spanish.

References

Unincorporated communities in Albany County, Wyoming
Unincorporated communities in Wyoming